Pallenis spinosa, commonly known as spiny starwort or spiny golden star, is an annual herbaceous plant  belonging to the genus Pallenis of the family Asteraceae. The Latin name of the genus is derived from palea (chaff), referring to the chaffy receptacle, while the species name spinosa, meaning spiny, refers to the spiny bracts surrounding the flowers.

Description
Pallenis spinosa reaches on average  of height. Leaves are alternate, lanceolate or elliptical. The basal ones have short petioles, while the cauline ones are sessile or semiamplexicaul. A solitary inflorescence grows at the top of the branches. The large, slightly convex  receptacle shows numerous, yellowish orange, hermaphrodite disc florets and two whorls of yellow ray florets. The long, villous, involucral bracts end in an apical sharp-pointed spine. The flowering period extends from May through July. Fruits are achenes of about 2–2,5 millimeters of length.

Gallery

Distribution
This plant occurs in desert and coastal habitats of Southern Europe, North Africa, the Canary Islands and the Middle East.

Habitat

References
 Judd, W.S., Campbell, C.S., Kellog, E.A. & Donoghue, M.J. (2002): Plant Systematics: a phylogenetic approach, Sinauer, Sunderland, Mass.
 Pignatti S. - Flora d'Italia - Edagricole – 1982. vol. III

External links
 Biolib
 Pallenis
 Oil of P. spinosa

Inuleae
Flora of Europe
Flora of North Africa
Flora of Central Asia
Flora of Western Asia
Flora of Italy
Flora of the Canary Islands
Taxa named by Carl Linnaeus